The 2000 Turkmenistan Higher League (Ýokary Liga) season was the eighth season of Turkmenistan's professional football league. Eleven teams competed in 2000.

Results

External links
 

Ýokary Liga seasons
Turk
Turk
1